Keith Lavarne Smith (born May 3, 1953) is a former Major League Baseball outfielder who played for the Texas Rangers in 1977 and the St. Louis Cardinals from 1979 to 1980. His minor league career spanned from 1972 to 1981. Brother of Bobby Smith who played for the 1973 Marion Mets. He was actually born as Keith LaVaughn Smith and Major League Baseball never corrected the error.

Smith was drafted twice before signing with a major league club. He was initially taken in the seventh round of the 1972 January Draft by the Cardinals out of Manatee Community College, but did not sign. After being drafted in the fourth round of the 1972 June Secondary Draft by the Rangers, he did sign.

On August 2, 1977, Smith made his major league debut at the age of 24. He had five plate appearances in his first game, going hitless in three at-bats with a walk and run scored off of Chicago White Sox pitcher Lerrin LaGrow. Less than two weeks later, on August 12, he hit the first home run of his major league career, also off of LaGrow. Smith played in 23 games in his inaugural big league season, hitting .239 with two home runs and six RBI.

He did not play in the majors in 1978, spending the entire season with the Triple-A Tucson Toros.

On February 12, 1979, he was traded to the Cardinals for pitcher Tommy Toms. He spent most of the season in the minors, hitting .350 in 119 games for the Springfield Cardinals. In a cup of coffee with the big league club that year, he hit .231 in 13 at-bats.

Smith appeared in 24 games for the Cardinals in 1980, hitting .129 in 31 at-bats. He played his final big league game on October 5. Overall, Smith hit .207 with two home runs and 8 RBI in 53 games during his three-year career.

He also spent nine seasons in the minor leagues, hitting .295 with 77 home runs and 120 stolen bases in 944 games. He played in the Rangers, Cardinals, Baltimore Orioles, New York Mets and New York Yankees systems.

References

External links
, or Retrosheet, or Pura Pelota

Living people
1953 births
Baseball players from Florida
Gastonia Rangers players
Geneva Senators players
Greensboro Hornets players
Major League Baseball left fielders
People from Palmetto, Florida
Pittsfield Rangers players
Rochester Red Wings players
Sacramento Solons players
SCF Manatees baseball players
Springfield Redbirds players
St. Louis Cardinals players
State College of Florida, Manatee–Sarasota alumni
Texas Rangers players
Tidewater Tides players
Tigres de Aragua players
American expatriate baseball players in Venezuela
Tucson Toros players